Bill Van Auken (born 1950) is a politician and activist for the Socialist Equality Party and was a presidential candidate in the U.S. presidential election of 2004, announcing his candidacy on January 27, 2004. His running mate was Jim Lawrence. He came in 15th for the popular vote, receiving 1,857 votes.  In November 2006, Van Auken ran for the United States Senate seat held by Hillary Clinton. He finished in sixth place, with 6,004 votes.

Van Auken is a full-time reporter for the World Socialist Web Site, and resides in New York City.

In the U.S. presidential election of 2008 he was the vice presidential nominee of the same party.

See also
New York United States Senate election, 2006
United States presidential election, 2004 (detail)

External links
Socialist Equality Party site
"Kerry’s dilemma: defending medals from a criminal war" article by Van Auken, including some of his own biographical details.

References

American people of Dutch descent
Candidates in the 2004 United States presidential election
2008 United States vice-presidential candidates
21st-century American politicians
1950 births
Living people
Socialist Equality Party (United States) politicians